During the 2007–08 season, the Guildford Flames participated in the semi-professional English Premier Ice Hockey League. It was the 16th year of ice hockey played by the Guildford Flames and the first season Paul Dixon was head coach. They were crowned EPL League Champions on 9 March 2008 following a 6–1 road victory over the Telford Tigers.

League table 

Final standings

[*] Secured play-off berth. [**] EPL League Champions

Premier Cup table

Group A 

[*]Advance to elimination stage

Knockout Cup table 
Final group standings

[*] Guildford advance to play Milton Keynes in a two legged semi-final.
[**] Sheffield and Peterborough advance to play each other in a two legged semi-final.
Peterborough beat Milton Keynes in 2 legged final.

Playoff group table

Group A 

[*]Advance to elimination stage

Results

September

October

November

December

January

February

March 

30 March at Romford was postponed until 3 April due to mechanical failure.

April

Points for the 2007/08 season 
Final stats in all competitions including playoffs.

Penalty shots

Goaltender stats 
Final stats in all competitions including play-offs.

 Note: Joe Watkins (21 saves) and Alex Mettam (16 saves) combined for a shutout in the 5–0 win over the Chelmsford Cheftians on 29 December 2007 and so does not count as a shut out in either Goaltenders official stats.

End-of-season awards 
The traditional end of season awards dinner was held on Monday 17 March 2008. The following awards were given out:
 Most Sportsman like – #37 Ben Austin
 British Player of the year – #30 Joe Watkins
 Players Player of the year – No. 14 Stuart Potts
 Top Point Scorer – No. 21 Milos Melicherik

The GIHSC (Guildford Ice Hockey Supporters Club) voted the following:
 Supporters British Player of the year – #14 Stuart Potts
 Supporters Player of the year – #77 Taras Foremsky

Team roster (as of 9 November 2007) 
Management
CEO  Rob Hepburn
Commercial manager  Kirk Humphreys
Financial controller  Thomas Hepburn

Coaching staff
Head coach  Paul Dixon
Assistant coach  Milos Melicherik
Assistant/equipment manager  Dave Wiggins
 
Goaltenders
1  Gavin Jackson
30  Joe Watkins
31  Alex Mettam
Forwards
8  Rob Lamey
14  Stuart Potts
17  Rick Plant – Captain
18  Ben Duggan
19  Terry Miles
21  Milos Melicherik – Alternate Captain
25  Vinnie Zavoral
32  Lukas Smital
38  Jozef Kohut
77  Taras Foremsky
91  Ollie Bronnimann
Defenders
4  Neil Liddiard – Alternate Captain
6  David Savage
7  Ben Jonhson
22  Paul Dixon
28  Dominic Hopkins
37  Ben Austin
55  Rick Skene
Utility
44  Nick Cross

External links 
 Official Guildford Flames website
 Flames Backburner Site (supporters club)
 Flames Photos

Gui
Guildford Flames seasons